Luge at the 2014 Winter Olympics was held at the Sliding Center Sanki near Krasnaya Polyana, Russia. The four events were scheduled for 8–13 February 2014.

In April 2011 the International Olympic Committee approved the addition of the mixed team relay event (one sled from each of the other three events compete per country), meaning luge will have four events on the program for the first time.

In December 2017, IOC concluded that two Russian lugers Albert Demchenko and Tatiana Ivanova had committed an anti-doping violation and stripped Russia of 2 silver medals. In January 2018, both athletes successfully appealed against the IOC decision at the Court of Arbitration for Sport and both medals were returned to Russia.

Competition schedule
The following is the competition schedule for all four events.
All times are (UTC+4).

Medal summary

Medal table

Events

Qualification

A total quota of 110 athletes were allowed to compete at the Games. Countries were assigned quotas using the world rankings of results from 1 November 2012 to 31 December 2013.

Participating nations
110 athletes from 24 nations were participating. Both Kazakhstan and Tonga (also making its Winter Olympics debut) marked their first Olympic appearances in the sport. India's athlete competed as an Independent Olympic Participants, as the Indian Olympic Association was suspended by the International Olympic Committee; the suspension was later lifted, but not before India's athlete had already competed under the Independent Olympic Participant banner. IOC decision to disqualify Russia was nullified by the Court of Arbitration for Sport.

References

External links
Official Results Book – Luge

 
Luge
2014
Winter Olympics
Luge competitions in Russia